The eHealth Exchange, formerly known as the Nationwide Health Information Network (NHIN or NwHIN), is an initiative for the exchange of healthcare information. It was developed under the auspices of the U.S. Office of the National Coordinator for Health Information Technology (ONC), and now managed by a non-profit industry coalition called Sequoia Project (formerly HealtheWay).  The exchange is a web-services based series of specifications designed to securely exchange healthcare related data. The NwHIN is related to the Direct Project which uses a secure email-based approach. One of the latest goals is to increase the amount of onboarding information about the NwHIN to prospective vendors of health care systems.

The Office of the National Coordinator for Health Information Technology has been facilitating development of the NwHIN, which will tie together health information exchanges, integrated delivery networks, pharmacies, government, labs, providers, payors and other stakeholders into a "network of networks."

A health care system participating in the NwHIN acquires an Object identifier (OID). The OID, issued by the ONC, allows the individual health care system or vendor to receive and send messages to trusted entities within the NwHIN through an interface such as Mirth Connect or a custom-built Java UI. The NwHIN is built on open source code utilizing the Java platform. This creates a need for technical information sharing among programmers with the ONC also making information available.

According to former Health and Human Services Secretary Michael Leavitt the NwHIN would be a public-private venture, and  the Markle Foundation, Robert Wood Johnson Foundation and California HealthCare Foundation were funding research and demonstration projects.

The NwHIN is funded through the Office of the National Coordinator for Health Information Technology, the Health Resources and Services Administration, the Agency for Healthcare Research and Quality, the Centers of Medicare and Medicaid Services, the Centers for Disease Control and Prevention, and the Indian Health Service.

Participants
The stakeholders that participate in the NwHIN will be four broad classes of organizations:
Care delivery organizations (CDOs) that use electronic health records (EHRs).
Consumer organizations that operate personal health records (PHRs) and other consumer applications.
Health information exchanges (HIEs): multi-stakeholder entities that enable the movement of health-related data within state, regional or non-jurisdictional participant groups.
Specialized participants: organizations that operate for specific purposes including, but not limited to, secondary users of data such as public health, research and quality assessment. The specialized nature of these organizations means that they may require only a subset of the shared architecture (standards, services and requirements), processes and procedures used by the other participants.

Health Information Service Providers
Some organizations may lack the necessary technical or operational competencies to conform to the architecture and provide the core services. Instead, they may choose to use the services of a Health Information Service Provider (HISP). A  is a company or other organization that will support one or more NwHIN participants by providing them with operational and technical health exchange services necessary to fully qualify to connect to the NwHIN.

Access process
The business, trust and technical arrangements that will enable the NwHIN generally will be local and between organizations. Nonetheless, the primary users of the NwHIN will be people: healthcare providers, healthcare consumers and those who use the data in the NwHIN for public health, quality assessment or other purposes. These people will have several ways to take advantage of the information exchange available through the NwHIN.

Access Paths to the System:
For healthcare providers:
Providers may use features of the electronic health record (EHR) systems of their own practice or hospital to connect to an HIE, and the HIE, in turn, will support information exchange with other EHRs or PHRs on that HIE or on other HIEs through the NwHIN;
They may not have an EHR, so they may use the Web to access a portal operated by the HIE to access information.

For healthcare consumers:
They may use features of a PHR that they designate as the repository of their personal health record, and that PHR may be connected to an HIE which, in turn, will provide a connection to the NwHIN;
They may use features of a multi-regional PHR that will participate directly in the NwHIN;
If they do not have access to a PHR, they may achieve some limited functionality by using the services of an HIE through its portal.

Related projects

CONNECT software
An open source software package is available that implements the NwHIN architecture from CONNECT. The CONNECT software is the outcome of a 2008 decision by federal agencies to begin work on connecting their health IT systems into the NwHIN. Rather than individually build the software required to make this possible, the federal agencies collaborated through the Federal Health Architecture program to create a single solution that can be reused by each agency within its own environment. Twenty-two Cooperative members, including seven federal agencies using the CONNECT gateway, participated in testing and demonstrations in 2008.

Direct project
The Direct project, which has been termed a scaled down version of the NwHIN, allows two trusted entities (for instance, a physician and a referred specialist) to share medical records. In this way, the patient's electronic record could be viewed by two trusted entities. These entities may not have access to the NwHIN in a product like the CONNECT software. However, they would have a trusted email address issued by the ONC.

Future direction
The NwHIN, as an operational entity, is moving from public (ONC-backed) operations, to a non-profit public-private structure.  Under this model, the ONC will maintain overall responsibility for the governance of the NwHIN. and the NwHIN operational entity will be known as the eHealth Exchange which will be facilitated by the non-profit Sequoia Project (formerly Healtheway), Inc. a membership-based corporation.

References

External links
Sequoia Project official website.
Direct Project official wiki.
HIEWatch (formerly NHINWatch), by HIMSS Media.
CONNECT Community Portal

Healthcare in the United States
Health informatics
Office of the National Coordinator for Health Information Technology